The Wrestler and the Clown is a 1957 Soviet drama film directed by Boris Barnet and Konstantin Yudin.

Plot 
Odessa at the turn of the XIX-XX centuries. Loader and amateur wrestler Ivan Poddubny comes to the circus and meets the clown trainer Anatoly Durov. Artists have to go through trials and humiliations. The circus manager mercilessly exploits artists who are bound by a slave contract. The talent and hard work of Poddubny and Durov allows them to go beyond the provincial circus and make an international career.

As a result, Poddubny, defeating the Frenchman Raoul le Boucher in the final, becomes the winner of the world wrestling championship, which was held in Paris.

Cast 
 Stanislav Chekan as Ivan Poddubny
 Aleksandr Mikhaylov as Anatoli Leonidovich Durov
 Yuriy Medvedev as Nikita, Ivan's pal
 Iya Arepina as    Mimi
 Boris Petker as Giuseppe Truzzi
 Leonid Topchiyev as Orlando  
 Tamara Loginova as Durov's  wife
 Georgiy Vitsin as Enrico, a clown  
 Kyunna Ignatova as Esterina Truzzi
 Stepan Kayukov as Vanya, wrestling contest promoter
 Grigoriy Shpigel as Solomonsky  
 Anatoliy Solovyov as Raoul Boucher 
 Grigori Abrikosov as Mr. Fish 
 Maya Kazakova as Alena  
 Polina Nyatko as Ivan's Mother
 Aleksandr Gumburg as Ivan's Father  
 Alexander Khvylya as Boucher's coach

References

External links 
 

1957 films
1950s Russian-language films
1950s sports drama films
Soviet sports drama films
Mosfilm films
1957 drama films
Circus films
Films about clowns
Films directed by Boris Barnet